RISC-loading complex subunit TARBP2 is a protein that in humans is encoded by the TARBP2 gene.

Function 

HIV-1, the causative agent of acquired immunodeficiency syndrome (AIDS), contains an RNA genome that produces a chromosomally integrated DNA during the replicative cycle. Activation of HIV-1 gene expression by the transactivator Tat is dependent on an RNA regulatory element (TAR) located downstream of the transcription initiation site. The protein encoded by this gene binds between the bulge and the loop of the HIV-1 TAR RNA regulatory element and activates HIV-1 gene expression in synergy with the viral Tat protein. Alternative splicing results in multiple transcript variants encoding different isoforms. This gene also has a pseudogene.

Interactions 

TARBP2 has been shown to interact with Protein kinase R and RBM14.

References

Further reading